Adolph Coors may refer to:

 Adolph Coors Sr. (1847–1929), brewer
 Adolph Coors II (1884–1970), businessman
 Adolph Coors III (1915–1960), kidnapping victim
 Adolph Coors Company
 Adolph Coors Foundation